Friedrich Wilhelm Heinrich Schäfke (21 July 1922 in Berlin, Weimar Germany – 4 April 2010) was a German mathematician and professor of geometry.

Writings
 Mathieusche Funktionen und Sphäroidfunktionen mit Anwendungen auf physikalische und technische Probleme, Springer 1954, with Josef Meixner 
 Einführung in die Theorie der speziellen Funktionen der mathematischen Physik, Springer 1963
 Differenzierbare Abbildungen, Köln 1967, with Dietrich Krekel und Dieter Schmdit
 Quasimetrische Räume und quasinormierte Gruppen, Birlinghoven St. Augustin 1971
 Gewöhnliche Differentialgleichungen. Die Grundlagen die Theorie im Reellen und Komplexen, Springer 1973, with Dieter Schmdit
 Integrale, 1992, with Dieter Hoffmann

References
 Obituary

External links
 Friedrich Wilhelm Schäfke in the catalog of the German National Library
 Friedrich Wilhelm Schäfke in the Mathematics Genealogy Project

20th-century German mathematicians
1922 births
2010 deaths